The 1965 African Cup of Nations was the fifth edition of the Africa Cup of Nations, the soccer championship of Africa (CAF). It was hosted by Tunisia. Just like in 1963, the field of six teams was split into two groups of three. Ghana retained its title, beating Tunisia in the final 3−2 after extra time. This was the final edition of the tournament to be held in an odd numbered year before 2013.

Qualified teams

Squads

Venues

Group stage

Group A 

Tunisia progress on a toss of a coin

Group B

Knockout stage

Third place match

Final

Scorers 
3 goals

  Eustache Manglé
  Ben Acheampong
  Osei Kofi

2 goals

  Pierre Kalala Mukendi
  Cecil Jones Attuquayefio
  Frank Odoi
  Louis Camara
  Matar Niang
  Tahar Chaïbi

1 goal

  Joseph Bléziri
  Konan Yoboué
  Luciano Vassallo
  Paa Nii Lutterodt
  Kwame Nti
  El Hadji Oumar Guèye
  Abdelmajid Chetali
  Mongi Delhoum
  Mohamed Salah Jedidi
  Abdelwahab Lahmar

External links 
 Details at RSSSF

 
Nations
International association football competitions hosted by Tunisia
Africa Cup of Nations tournaments
Africa Cup of Nations
Africa Cup of Nations